Grady Hunt (May 16, 1921 – May 5, 2013) was an American costume designer. He was nominated for seven Primetime Emmy Awards in the category Outstanding Costumes for his work on the television programs Columbo, The Snoop Sisters, The Quest, Quark, Beulah Land, Fantasy Island and the television film Ziegfeld: The Man and His Women. Hunt died in May 2013 in Hollywood, California, at the age of 91.

References

External links 

1921 births
2013 deaths
People from Texas
American costume designers